Box railway station served the town of Box in Wiltshire, England. The station was on the main Great Western Railway line from London to Bristol and was opened when the Chippenham to Bath section opened in June 1841.

The Rev. W. Awdry, author of The Railway Series books lived next to the railway station and would spend many hours with his father watching the passing steam locomotives.

The name board of the former signal box with the name "Box Signal Box" is preserved in the National Railway Museum at York.

References 

 

Box, Wiltshire
Disused railway stations in Wiltshire
Former Great Western Railway stations
Railway stations in Great Britain opened in 1841
Railway stations in Great Britain closed in 1965
Beeching closures in England